Aleksander Bach is a German film director, best known for directing Hitman: Agent 47.

Early life 
Bach was born in Lublin, Poland, later moved to Solingen, Germany with his parents in his childhood, and grew up in Solingen. He graduated in Audio Visual Engineering from the Robert Schumann Hochschule, and then completed his post-graduate degree from the Film Academy Baden-Württemberg.

Career 
Bach started his career as a music video director and then ventured into making advertisements for several major clients.

In 2015, Bach made his feature directorial debut with the action film Hitman: Agent 47, based on the video game series Hitman. Rupert Friend portrayed the lead role of a secret agent named Agent 47, along with Hannah Ware as the female lead. The film was released on August 21, 2015 by 20th Century Fox.

Filmography

References

External links 
 
 

Living people
1980 births
Polish film directors
People from Lublin
Film directors from Berlin
Polish music video directors
German music video directors
Robert Schumann Hochschule alumni
Polish emigrants to Germany